IHRC may refer to:

Immigration History Research Center at the University of Minnesota in the United States
Indiana Hi-Rail Corporation, defunct railroad company of the United States
International Hurricane Research Center at Florida International University in the United States
Irish Human Rights Commission, government agency in Ireland
Islamic Human Rights Commission, advocacy organization in London, United Kingdom